Bangkok Bus Terminal (Borommaratchachonnani) is a bus station that is the terminal of bus service from Bangkok to many provinces in southern Thailand (including nearby provinces of Bangkok).

Location
The station is located along Borommaratchachonnani Road in Taling Chan District's Chim Phli, western suburb of Bangkok.

History
Originally, the southern bus terminal was located on Charansanitwong Road at Fai Chai Junction. It opened for service on January 1, 1960.

In 1989, it shifted to Borommaratchachonnani Road near present CentralPlaza Pinklao, due to the traffic situation around the station. And shifted again to present location in 1994.

That is why the station has many names, including "Bangkok Bus Terminal (Taling Chan)" and "Southern Bus Terminal". Since the location has been relocated many times, therefore popularly referred to as "New Southern Bus Terminal"  by Thais. Not to be confused with another station that used to be on Borommaratchachonnani Road near CentralPlaza Pinklao still in service but reduced to only van and minibus segment. The old station often known as Bangkok Bus Terminal (Pinklao) or Old Southern Bus Terminal. The two stations are approximately 5 km (3 mi) apart.

The current station operated on November 1, 2007. It operates like an airport, the only those with tickets can enter the boarding area.

Layout & facilities
The station covers an area of 37 rai (about 11 acres).

The main station building is an air-conditioned building with a total of 4 floors, called SC Plaza.
M floor: parking, shops, employment agency, café, book stalls, banking service
G floor: platform 1–24, ticket counters, taxi and minibus service, shops and convenience stores, banking service, fitness club
1st floor: platform 25–98, ticket counters, shops and convenience store, fast food restaurants, banking service, Muslim prayer room, room for Buddhist monk
2nd floor: food court, passport department, amulet center

Moreover, the station is surrounded by many private southern courier service companies. Night market, Saitai Center is next to the station.

Bus routes
The following BMTA and affiliated routes serve this station: Y70E (Salaya–Mo Chit BTS Station), 28 (Bangkok Bus Terminal (Taling Chan)–Victory Monument), 35 (Bangkok Bus Terminal (Taling Chan)–Wat Son), 40 (Bangkok Bus Terminal (Taling Chan)–Bangkok Railway Station), 66 (Chaeng Watthana Government Complex–Bangkok Bus Terminal (Taling Chan)), 79 (Phutthamonthon Sai 2–Ratchaprasong), 123 (Om Yai–Sanam Luang), 124 (Salaya–Sanam Luang), 146 (Taling Chan–Bang Khae), 149 (Phutthamonthon Sai 2–Bangkok Bus Terminal (Ekkamai)), 511 (Pak Nam–Bangkok Bus Terminal (Taling Chan)), 515 (Central Plaza Salaya–Victory Monument), 516 (Bua Thong Kheha–Thewet), 539 (Om Noi–Victory Monument), 556 (Wat Rai Khing–Makkasan).

References

Taling Chan district
Bus stations in Thailand
Bus transport in Bangkok